is a railway station in Jōyō, Kyoto, Japan.

Lines

Kintetsu Railway
Kyoto Line

Layout
The station has two platforms serving two tracks.

Platforms

History

1928 - The station opens as a part of Nara Electric Railway
1963 - NER merges and the station becomes part of Kintetsu
2007 - Starts using PiTaPa

Adjacent stations

Railway stations in Kyoto Prefecture
Railway stations in Japan opened in 1928